The 1993 Holiday Bowl was a college football bowl game played December 30, 1993, in San Diego, California. It was part of the 1993 NCAA Division I-A football season. It featured the tenth ranked Ohio State Buckeyes, and the unranked BYU Cougars. It was famous for coach John Cooper's famous bowl win guarantee, which he came through on.

Game summary
Ohio State - Patillo 20 punt return (Williams kick), 11:04
BYU - Willis 27 pass from Walsh (Herrick kick), 8:49
Ohio State - Harris 2 run (Williams kick), 5:30
Ohio State - Harris 2 run (Williams kick), 14:55
BYU - Lewis 8 pass from Walsh (Herrick kick), 7:29
BYU - Doman 27 pass from Walsh (Herrick kick), 3:25
Ohio State - Harris 1 run (Williams kick), 4:11

Ohio State got on the board first after defender Tim Patillo recovered a blocked punt, and ran it in four yards for a touchdown, putting Ohio State up 7–0. BYU quarterback John Walsh threw a 27-yard touchdown pass to running back Jamal Willis tying the game at 7. Ohio State running back senior Raymont Harris scored on a 2-yard touchdown run to cap the first quarter scoring, and give Ohio State a 14–7 lead. He would finish with a Holiday Bowl record 235 yards rushing on 39 carries.

In the second quarter, Raymont Harris scored on another two-yard touchdown run giving Ohio State a 21–7 lead. BYU's John Walsh threw an 8-yard touchdown pass to tight end Chad Lewis pulling BYU to 21–14. John Walsh later threw a 27-yard touchdown pass to Bryce Doman before halftime, tying the game at 21.

In the third quarter, Raymont Harris scored his third rushing touchdown of the game, a 1 yarder, to give Ohio State a 28–21 lead. In the fourth quarter, John Walsh threw a 52-yard pass to Eric Drage, giving BYU the ball at the Ohio State 6-yard line with 32 seconds left. On 1st and 2nd down, Walsh threw two incomplete passes, making it 3rd down. Walsh then found a wide open Tim Nowatzke, but he dropped it. He was wide open again on 4th down, but Walsh underthrew him, giving Ohio State the win.

To date, this is the last Holiday Bowl appearance for BYU, having appeared in 10 out of the 16 games played at the time.

References

External links
New York Times summary of game

Holiday Bowl
Holiday Bowl
BYU Cougars football bowl games
Ohio State Buckeyes football bowl games
Holiday Bowl
Holiday Bowl